Kristian Kullamäe (born 25 May 1999) is an Estonian professional basketball player for Lietkabelis Panevėžys of the Lithuanian Basketball League (LKL) and the EuroCup. He also represents the Estonian national basketball team internationally.

Professional career
A native of Tallinn, Kullamäe started his career in 2014 in the ranks of Audentes, which at the time played in the Estonian first division Korvpalli Meistriliiga (KML). On 13 September 2016, Kullamäe signed with Rockets Gotha of the German second division ProA. After helping his team advance to the league finals, Kullamae made his debut in the top-tier Basketball Bundesliga (BBL) in the following 2017–2018 season. On 31 July 2018, Kullamäe returned to the ProA by signing with Baunach Young Pikes for the 2018–2019 season. On 11 July 2019, he signed with  Real Canoe of the Spanish LEB Oro.

On 6 August 2020, Kullamäe signed a three-year contract with San Pablo Burgos of the Liga ACB. Under the terms of his contract, Kullamäe spent his first year playing on loan for Palma of the LEB Oro, where he was one of the leading players with 16.0 points per game. In the following season, he made his Liga ACB debut with Burgos, playing limited minutes. Kullamae chose to opt out of the final year of his contract after Burgos were relegated to LEB Oro for the 2022–23 season.

On 1 August 2022, Kullamäe signed with Lietkabelis Panevėžys of the Lithuanian Basketball League (LKL) and the EuroCup. On 30 November 2022, Kullamäe recorded 24 points (9/12 FG), six rebounds, seven assists and a 28-point PIR in a 104–98 home win over Cedevita Olimpija.

National team career
Kullamäe made his debut for the Estonian national team on 25 February 2018, in a 2019 FIBA Basketball World Cup qualifier against Israel, scoring 8 points in a 78–62 home victory.

Personal life
Kristian is the son of former Estonia international and current basketball coach, Gert Kullamäe.

Career statistics

Domestic leagues

Estonia national team

|-
| style="text-align:left;"| 2014
| style="text-align:left;"| 2014 FIBA Europe Under-16 Championship Division B
| style="text-align:left;"| Estonia U-16
| 9 || 6 || 23.6 || .333 || .267 || .250 || 3.7 || 2.0 || 1.9 || .2 || 9.0
|-
| style="text-align:left;"| 2015
| style="text-align:left;"| 2015 FIBA Europe Under-16 Championship Division B
| style="text-align:left;"| Estonia U-16
| 8 || 8 || 24.4 || .402 || .333 || .667 || 4.9 || 3.6 || 1.4 || .1 || 11.4
|-
| style="text-align:left;"| 2016
| style="text-align:left;"| 2016 FIBA Europe Under-18 Championship Division B
| style="text-align:left;"| Estonia U-18
| 8 || - || 28.9 || .417 || .286 || .636 || 5.2 || 2.6 || 1.8 || .2 || 17.6
|-
| style="text-align:left;"| 2017
| style="text-align:left;"| 2017 FIBA U18 European Championship Division B
| style="text-align:left;"| Estonia U-18
| 8 || 8 || 22.8 || .400 || .279 || .882 || 3.6 || 4.3 || 1.1 || .3 || 12.9
|-
| style="text-align:left;"| 2018–19
| style="text-align:left;"| 2019 Basketball World Cup Qualification
| style="text-align:left;"| Estonia
| 9 || 6 || 22.6 || .388 || .171 || .455 || 2.2 || 2.6 || .8 || .1 || 8.7
|-
| style="text-align:left;"| 2020
| style="text-align:left;"| EuroBasket 2022 qualification
| style="text-align:left;"| Estonia
| 5 || 5 || 28.6 || .517 || .364 || .667 || 2.2 || 4.2 || 1.0 || .0 || 16.0

References

External links
Kristian Kullamäe at basket.ee 
Kristian Kullamäe at fiba.com
Kristian Kullamäe at proballers.com
Kristian Kullamäe at realgm.com

1999 births
Living people
Baunach Young Pikes players
BC Lietkabelis players
CB Miraflores players
Estonian expatriate basketball people in Germany
Estonian expatriate basketball people in Lithuania
Estonian expatriate basketball people in Spain
Estonian men's basketball players
Korvpalli Meistriliiga players
Point guards
Real Canoe NC basketball players
Rockets (basketball club) players
Shooting guards
Basketball players from Tallinn